667 Denise is a minor planet orbiting the Sun.
The name may have been inspired by the asteroid's provisional designation 1908 DN.

References

External links
 
 

Background asteroids
Denise
Denise
19080723